Vivek Vihar is a neighborhood in Delhi located near Uttar Pradesh border, and one of the subdivisions of Shahdara District.

Vivek Vihar is one of the preferred localities of East Delhi, primarily consisting of residential developments dominated by builder floors and independent houses. The locality is horizontal in nature comprising low to mid-rise establishments. It is surrounded by other important East Delhi areas such as Anand Vihar, Jhilmil Colony and Surajmal Vihar, Vishwas Nagar, Bihari Colony, Teliwara, Bhola Nath Nagar. On the whole, Vivek Vihar enjoys good connectivity (road, rail and metro) coupled with availability of all social and retail amenities. It is a systematically laid out locality divided into blocks (Block A to D).

References 

Neighbourhoods in Delhi
District subdivisions of Delhi